Mutt Boy (lit. "Shit dog") is a 2003 South Korean film starring Jung Woo-sung, Kim Kap-soo and Uhm Ji-won. A developmentally-disabled boy grows up in a rural town, and eventually attracts a small gang of followers due to his fighting skills. However, he keeps getting into trouble against the law, and getting picked up by his father who works as a police officer.

Plot
Chul-min's family consists of himself, his police detective father, his sick mother, and a dog. Chul-min calls the dog "Mutt" or "Stray Dog," but his father calls Chul-min "Mutt" too. The dog is Chul-min's best friend. He doesn't cry when his mom dies, but he does get furious when his dog is eaten by the older boys in his soccer club. He takes his revenge, but his father's patrol car awaits him. Although he now must live on his own, Chul-min wins renown as the one who beat up 21 people all by himself. Many of the town's thugs start to hang around Chul-min, fascinated by him, and he becomes a leader of small-time gangsters. One day his father takes in a young orphan named Jung-ae who was a thief. Eventually Chul-min and Jung-ae develop feelings for each other and Chul-min confronts the gang who killed his beloved dog.

Cast
Jung Woo-sung ... Cha Chul-min
Uhm Ji-won ... Kim Jung-ae
Kim Kap-soo ... Chul-min's father
Kim Jung-tae ... Jin-mook
Hong Ji-young ... Soon-ja
Yang Joon-kyung ... Oh Deok-man
Lee Soo-ho ... Dae-deok
Kim Sang-ho ... Jang-son
Park Sang-gyu ... Detective Park
Heo Wook ... Gye-hwan

External links
  
 
 
 

Films directed by Kwak Kyung-taek
2003 comedy-drama films
2003 films
South Korean coming-of-age films
South Korean action films
2000s South Korean films